Russellysin (Russell's viper venom factor X activator, RVV-X, blood-coagulation factor X activating enzyme, metalloproteinase RVV-x, Vipera russelli proteinase, Russell's viper blood coagulation factor X activator, RVV-V) is an enzyme. This enzyme catalyses the following chemical reaction

 Specifically activates several components of the blood clotting system, including coagulation factor X, coagulation factor IX and protein C by cleavage of -Arg- bonds. Has no action on insulin B chain

This enzyme is present in the venom of Russell's viper (Vipera russelli).

References

External links 
 

EC 3.4.24